Pultenaea largiflorens, commonly known as twiggy bush-pea, is a species of flowering plant in the family Fabaceae and is endemic to south-eastern continental Australia. It is a rigid, erect shrub with narrow egg-shaped leaves with the narrower end towards the base, and bright yellow and crimson flowers.

Description
The leaves are often folded lengthwise and the upper surface is paler than the lower.

Taxonomy and naming
Pultenaea largiflorens was first formally described in 1864 by George Bentham in Flora Australiensis from an unpublished description by Ferdinand von Mueller. The specific epithet (largiflorens) means "plentiful-flowering".

Distribution and habitat
Twiggy push-pea grows in forest, woodland and mallee in Victoria, New South Wales and South Australia. It is most common in central Victoria, and occurs in the west of New South Wales, south from West Wyalong and in the south-east of South Australia.

References

largiflorens
Flora of Victoria (Australia)
Flora of New South Wales
Flora of South Australia
Plants described in 1864
Taxa named by George Bentham